The Fickle (Persian title: Bolhavass- )  is a 1934 Iranian romance drama film directed by Ebrahim Moradi and starring Mohammad Ali Ghotbi, Ahmad Dehghan, Ahmad Gorji , Qodsi Partowi and Touran Veisi.

References

1934 films
1934 romantic drama films
1930s Persian-language films
Iranian black-and-white films
Iranian romantic drama films